Cylinder is a city in Palo Alto County, Iowa, United States.  The population was 87 at the time of the 2020 census.

History
The town began in 1885 with the construction of a large hay barn, and soon after a railway siding was built to load the hay. In 1890 a railway depot was constructed, and the town was incorporated in 1900.

The original railway depot was named after nearby Cylinder Creek, which may have received its name after early settlers dropped an engine into the mud and never recovered it.

Professional wrestler Danny Havoc was born in Cylinder, and started wrestling in his family's barn with friends after school.

Geography
Cylinder is located at  (43.089159, -94.550092).

Demographics

2010 census
As of the census of 2010, there were 88 people, 39 households, and 22 families residing in the city. The racial makeup of the city was 98.9% White and 1.1% from two or more races.

There were 39 households, of which 25.6% had children under the age of 18 living with them, 51.3% were married couples living together, 2.6% had a female householder with no husband present, 2.6% had a male householder with no wife present, and 43.6% were non-families. 33.3% of all households were made up of individuals, and 18% had someone living alone who was 65 years of age or older. The average household size was 2.26 and the average family size was 2.95.

The median age in the city was 47.5 years. 23.9% of residents were under the age of 18; 3.3% were between the ages of 18 and 24; 20.5% were from 25 to 44; 33% were from 45 to 64; and 19.3% were 65 years of age or older. The gender makeup of the city was 55.7% male and 44.3% female.

2000 census
As of the census of 2000, there were 110 people, 45 households, and 31 families residing in the city. The racial makeup of the city was 98.18% White, 0.91% from other races, and 0.91% from two or more races. Hispanic or Latino of any race were 1.82% of the population.

There were 45 households, out of which 35.6% had children under the age of 18 living with them, 57.8% were married couples living together, 6.7% had a female householder with no husband present, and 31.1% were non-families. 26.7% of all households were made up of individuals, and 13.3% had someone living alone who was 65 years of age or older. The average household size was 2.44 and the average family size was 2.97.

In the city, the population was spread out, with 29.1% under the age of 18, 4.5% from 18 to 24, 30.9% from 25 to 44, 23.6% from 45 to 64, and 11.8% who were 65 years of age or older. The median age was 36 years. For every 100 females, there were 107.5 males. For every 100 females age 18 and over, there were 100.0 males.

The median income for a household in the city was $24,750, and the median income for a family was $40,625. Males had a median income of $30,625 versus $14,250 for females. The per capita income for the city was $12,953. There were 21.2% of families and 31.9% of the population living below the poverty line, including 62.5% of under eighteens and none of those over 64.

Education
Emmetsburg Community School District operates public schools.

References

Cities in Iowa
Cities in Palo Alto County, Iowa